Daughter is a 2014 South Korean drama film directed, written, and starring Ku Hye-sun.

Daughter premiered at the 19th Busan International Film Festival ahead of its theatrical release on November 6, 2014.

Plot
San experienced a grim childhood and adolescence with her emotionally, verbally and physically abusive mother. Unrelentingly critical and demanding, San's mother was particularly obsessed with preventing her teenage daughter from taking full possession of her sexuality. San's only reprieve was her piano lessons with a kindly next-door neighbor, Jeong-hee. Years later, when the adult San learns that she is pregnant, she visits her estranged, terminally ill mother at the hospital. Despite awaiting her imminent death, her mother has not changed at all, and San wonders if she will ever be free of the painful memories.

Cast
 Ku Hye-sun as San
Hyun Seung-min as young San
 Shim Hye-jin as Mom
 Yoon Da-kyung as Jeong-hee
 Lee Hae-woo as Jin-woo
 Yang Hyun-mo

References

External links 
 
 

2014 films
2010s Korean-language films
South Korean drama films
2010s South Korean films